Count Phlippe de Pret Roose de Calesberg (1908–1983) was a Belgian bobsledder who competed in the 1930s. He finished eighth in the four-man event at the 1936 Winter Olympics in Garmisch-Partenkirchen.

He was part of the de Pret Roose de Calesberg family.

References
1936 bobsleigh four-man results
1936 Olympic Winter Games official report. - p. 415.
 List of Belgian royalty 

1908 births
1983 deaths
Belgian male bobsledders
Counts of Belgium
Bobsledders at the 1936 Winter Olympics
Olympic bobsledders of Belgium